The Grand Synagogue of Nuremberg, completed in 1874 and destroyed in 1938, was the third synagogue in Nuremberg, and was built after the plans of architect Adolf Wolff.

Previous synagogues in Nuremberg 
The first medieval age synagogue stood on the site of today's Frauenkirche at the Hauptmarkt, and it was destroyed during the anti-Jewish pogroms of 1349. A second one was located at the Wunderburggasse, and was destroyed in 1499 during another pogrom.

Architecture and history 

The synagogue, located at Hans-Sachs-Platz, connected elements of Christian church architecture with oriental decoration, and symbolized the integration of Jews into the city's society after a 400-year ban on Judaism. Also, the synagogue was cherished by tourists, and was called the Perle in der Silhouette und Zierde der Stadt ("pearl in the skyline and adornment of the town").

It was designed by Adolf Wolff (1832-1885) for the city's approximately 300 Jewish families at a cost of 46,000 florins. The first stone was installed in 1870, and the grand opening was on 8 and  9 September 1874, with the leaders of the area's various Christian communities attending. 

It had seating for 389 women and 546 men.

In 1875, an organ was installed.

In 1886, Luitpold, Prince Regent of Bavaria visited.

In September 1897, Wilhelm II, German Emperor visited with his wife and two of his children. He met with the senior Rabbi, Dr. Ziemlich, and asked him about the city's Jewish community and compared the synagogue with another he had visited in Prague.

In August 1938, the synagogue was seized and destroyed on the orders of mayor Willy Liebel and Julius Streicher, the Gauleiter of Franconia, who stated that it was architecturally offensive. The process of destruction was interrupted by the Reichsparteitag and was only completed on 27 September 1938.

The community produced some of Germany's leading Reform Judaism scholars. In 1902, a smaller Orthodox Synagogue was established in Nuremberg. It was destroyed in 1938 during the Kristallnacht.

Rabbis 

1874 - 1880 Dr. Moritz Lewin - Later became a leader of Berlin's Reform Judaism movement.

1881 - 1907 Dr. Pincus Bernhard Ziemlich 

1907 - 1934 Dr. Max Freudenthal

1912 - 1939 Dr. Isaak (Ernst) Heilbronn - Fled to the USA in 1939 and became a rabbi at Congregation Beth Hillel in New York

Gallery

Post-war era 
After the war ended, the city of Nuremberg did not decide to reconstruct the synagogue, in spite of the area being not overbuilt and available for construction work. Also, the winning entry of Nuremberg's 1947 architectural competition - intended to gather the best plans on how to rebuild the city - did not envision a synagogue on its original premises. Heinz Schmeißner, who won the prize, was also the city's official for surface construction from 1937 to 1945, and thus he also formally oversaw the destruction of the synagogue.

References 

Synagogues in Germany
Synagogues completed in 1874
Demolished buildings and structures in Germany
Kristallnacht
Synagogues destroyed during Kristallnacht (Germany)
Former synagogues in Germany
Reform synagogues in Germany